SUN domain-containing protein 5, formerly known as sperm-associated antigen 4-like protein (SPAGL4), is a protein that in humans is encoded by the SUN5 gene.

References

Further reading